The Society of Hispanic Professional Engineers (SHPE) was founded in Los Angeles, California in 1974 by a group of engineers employed by the city of Los Angeles. Their objective was to form a National organization of professional engineers to serve as role models in the Latino community.

Social Networking was the key basis for the organization. SHPE quickly established two student chapters to begin the network that would grow to encompass the nation as well as reach countries outside the United States. There are now close to 300 chapters across the United States that are part of the SHPE's network.

On June 1, 2017, SHPE announced Raquel Tamez would join the organization as Chief Executive Officer. One month later, Miguel Alemañy was announced as the new Chair of the National Board of Directors.

Along with AISES, NSBE, and SWE, SHPE is a founding member of the 50K Coalition, the collaborative is made up of more than 40 organizations with the goal of producing 50,000 diverse engineering graduates every year by the year 2025. In addition to SHPE, SHPE is also a member of the STEM Education Coalition, which raises public awareness about the critical role that STEM education plays in enabling the United States to remain the economic and technological leader of the global marketplace for years to come.

Programs 
Volunteer leaders serve in leadership roles within SHPE's regions and chapters, which deliver SHPE's core programs. In addition to raising awareness of STEM and increasing access to it among Hispanic and Latino communities, SHPE's programs serve K-12, undergraduate, graduate students, as well as academic and industry professionals. SHPE offers the following individual programs in addition to its overall leadership development framework (SHPEology) for undergraduates, graduate students, and working professionals. There are a number of programs run by SHPE, which are listed below:

 SHPE Academics: Supports the journey of those in academia
 SHPE Professionals: Offers leadership strategies that make a positive workplace impact
 SHPE Technology & Innovation: Shines a spotlight on the latest technology and innovation in STEM
 SHPE K-12: Offers student-focused programs to get young people excited about STEM
 MentorSHPE: Provides a platform for members to build lasting relationships with other members
 Noche de Ciencias: Family science night events promoting STEM awareness to K-12 students
 ScholarSHPE: Offers students financial support to narrow the gap in the Hispanic and Latino STEM education pipeline
 SHPEology: Designed to raise awareness about the importance of Hispanic and Latino inclusion in STEM
 SHPEtina: Empowering Latinas in STEM offers strategies to thrive and overcome obstacles

Events 
SHPE also maintains a strong network by hosting three annual events offering leadership skills training and networking opportunities for its membership and supporters. These events include:

 National Convention. As the organization's signature event, this is the largest technical and career conference for Hispanics and Latinos in the United States, attracting over 6,000 engineering professionals, students, and corporate representatives. The conference features educational and technical panel discussions and workshops for its professional and student attendees. In addition, companies recruit talent for jobs and internships via a Career Fair Expo, as well as support competitions that allow undergraduate and graduate students the opportunity to showcase their talents. There are specialized programs available for pre-college students, prospective graduate students, and academic and engineering professionals, as well as a Distinguished Lecture Series led by STEM academics.
 National Institute for Leadership Advancement (NILA). This conference convenes newly elected chapter leaders from SHPE's undergraduate and professional chapters, offering leadership, community engagement, and mentorship skills training through workshops, lectures, individual and team exercises, hands-on activities, and small group breakout sessions. All attendees receive the Certified Chapter Leader certificate upon program completion.
 Regional Leadership Development Conference (RLDC).  These conferences, which are held in all seven of SHPE's regions at a university, convene members of a region's student chapters to improve their organizational, managerial, and technical skills. There is a focus on developing and improving chapters’ K-12 outreach programs, chapter infrastructure improvement, and corporate network strengthening.

STAR Awards 
Exclusive to the National SHPE Convention is the STAR Awards Gala, which recognizes key individuals and corporations who have contributed significantly to support Hispanics and Latinos in STEM. SHPE presents the following awards:

 Jaime Oaxaca Award. Recognizes the recipient's unselfish and outstanding contributions in the fields of engineering and science and in the community, as well as his/her unwavering dedication and commitment to the Society's advancement.
 Government Agency of the Year. Presented to an agency demonstrating support to SHPE's educational programs and advancement of the Society's mission.
 Corporate Achievement Award. Presented to an individual with project, budget, and departmental responsibilities who has made significant accomplishments in the scientific, technical, or engineering arena within a corporation.
 Company of the Year Award. Recognizes outstanding support to SHPE and its programs, based on significant, measurable, and visible assistance to help SHPE meet its goals; promotion of the achievements of Hispanic and Latino employees; dedication and commitment to the advancement of the Society's growth and development; and demonstrated partnerships with public schools that have a high Hispanic and Latino enrollment.
 Chapter Advisor of the Year
 Community Service Award
 Diversity Award
 Educator of the Year Higher Education Award
 Hispanic in Technology – Corporate
 Hispanic in Technology – Government
 Professional Role Model
 Student Role Model – Graduate
 Student Role Model – Undergraduate
 Innovator
 Manager of the Year
 Promising Engineer
 Junipero Serra Award
 Star of Today Award
 Star of Tomorrow Award
 Young Investigator
 Rubén Hinojosa STEM Champion
 Pioneer of the Year

Industry Partnership Council 
Composed of national companies and government agencies committed to diversity and inclusion, SHPE's Industry Partnership Council (IPC) supports year-round programming, shares industry perspectives, provides resources and development tools, and invests in recruitment and retention for SHPE chapters. There are more than 45 IPC members.

Regions 

SHPE is a national organization and is divided into seven regions as the picture below shows.

References

Engineering societies based in the United States
Hispanic and Latino American professional organizations
Organizations based in Los Angeles
Science and technology in California
Organizations established in 1974
1974 establishments in California